Lapinha Biological Reserve is a small State Biological Reserve in the municipality of Leopoldina, Minas Gerais, Brazil.

History

Status

The municipality was once covered in semi-deciduous forest of the Atlantic Forest biome, but has been severely deforested.
As of 2009 the State Biological Reserve was a "strict nature reserve" under IUCN protected area category Ia.

References

Sources

1974 establishments in Brazil
Biological reserves of Brazil
Protected areas of Minas Gerais
Protected areas established in 1974
Protected areas of the Atlantic Forest